In solid mechanics, a reinforced solid is a brittle material that is reinforced by ductile bars or fibres. A common application is reinforced concrete. When the concrete cracks the tensile force in a crack is not carried any more by the concrete but by the steel reinforcing bars only. The reinforced concrete will continue to carry the load provided that sufficient reinforcement is present. A typical design problem is to find the smallest amount of reinforcement that can carry the stresses on a small cube (Fig. 1). This can be formulated as an optimization problem.

Optimization problem

The reinforcement is directed in the x, y and z direction. The reinforcement ratio is defined in a cross-section of a reinforcing bar as the reinforcement area  over the total area , which is the brittle material area plus the reinforcement area.

 =  / 

 =  / 

 =  / 

In case of reinforced concrete the reinforcement ratios are usually between 0.1% and 2%. The stress tensor of the brittle material is

.

This can be interpreted as the stress tensor of the composite material minus the stresses carried by the reinforcement at yielding. This formulation is accurate for reinforcement ratio's smaller than 5%. It is assumed that the brittle material has no tensile strength. (In case of reinforced concrete this assumption is necessary because the concrete has small shrinkage cracks.) Therefore, the principal stresses of the brittle material need to be compression. The principal stresses of a stress tensor are its eigenvalues.

The optimization problem is formulated as follows. Minimize  +  +  subject to all eigenvalues of the brittle material stress tensor are less than or equal to zero (negative-semidefinite). Additional constraints are  ≥ 0,  ≥ 0,  ≥ 0.

Solution

The solution to this problem can be presented in a form most suitable for hand calculations. It can be presented in graphical form. It can also be presented in a form most suitable for computer implementation. In this article the latter method is shown.

There are 12 possible reinforcement solutions to this problem, which are shown in the table below. Every row contains a possible solution. The first column contains the number of a solution. The second column gives conditions for which a solution is valid. Columns 3, 4 and 5 give the formulas for calculating the reinforcement ratios.

The algorithm for obtaining the right solution is simple. Compute the reinforcement ratios of each possible solution that fulfills the conditions. Further ignore solutions with a reinforcement ratio less than zero. Compute the values of  +  +  and select the solution for which this value is smallest. The principal stresses in the brittle material can be computed as the eigenvalues of the brittle material stress tensor, for example by Jacobi's method.

The formulas can be simply checked by substituting the reinforcement ratios in the brittle material stress tensor and calculating the invariants. The first invariant needs to be less than or equal to zero. The second invariant needs to be greater than or equal to zero. These provide the conditions in column 2. For solution 2 to 12, the third invariant needs to be zero.

Examples

The table below shows computed reinforcement ratios for 10 stress tensors. The applied reinforcement yield stress is  = 500 N/mm². The mass density of the reinforcing bars is 7800 kg/m3. In the table  is the computed brittle material stress.  is the optimised amount of reinforcement.

Safe approximation

The solution to the optimization problem can be approximated conservatively.

 ≤ 

 ≤ 

 ≤ 

This can be proofed as follows. For this upper bound, the characteristic polynomial of the brittle material stress tensor is

,

which does not have positive roots, or eigenvalues.

The approximation is easy to remember and can be used to check or replace computation results.

Extension

The above solution can be very useful to design reinforcement; however, it has some practical limitations. The following aspects can be included too, if the problem is solved using convex optimization:
Multiple stress tensors in one point due to multiple loads on the structure instead of only one stress tensor 
A constraint imposed to crack widths at the surface of the structure 
Shear stress in the crack (aggregate interlock) 
Reinforcement in other directions than x, y and z 
Reinforcing bars that already have been placed in the reinforcement design process 
The whole structure instead of one small material cube in turn 
Large reinforcement ratio's
Compression reinforcement

Bars in any direction

Reinforcing bars can have other directions than the x, y and z direction. In case of bars in one direction the stress tensor of the brittle material is computed by

where  are the angles of the bars with the x, y and z axis. Bars in other directions can be added in the same way.

Utilization

Often, builders of reinforced concrete structures know, from experience, where to put reinforcing bars. Computer tools can support this by checking whether proposed reinforcement is sufficient. To this end the tension criterion,

The eigenvalues of  shall be less than or equal to zero.

is rewritten into,

The eigenvalues of  shall be less than or equal to one.

The latter matrix is the utilization tensor. The largest eigenvalue of this tensor is the utilization (unity check), which can be displayed in a contour plot of a structure for all load combinations related to the ultimate limit state.

For example, the stress at some location in a structure is  = 4 N/mm²,  = -10 N/mm²,  = 3 N/mm²,  = 3 N/mm²,  = -7 N/mm²,  = 1 N/mm². The reinforcement yield stress is  = 500 N/mm². The proposed reinforcement is  = 1.4%,  = 0.1%,  = 1.9%. The eigenvalues of the utilization tensor are -20.11, -0.33 and 1.32. The utilization is 1.32. This shows that the bars are overloaded and 32% more reinforcement is required.

Combined compression and shear failure of the concrete can be checked with the Mohr-Coulomb criterion applied to the eigenvalues of the stress tensor of the brittle material.

 ≤ 1, 

Cracks in the concrete can be checked by replacing the yield stress  in the utilization tensor by the bar stress at which the maximum crack width occurs. (This bar stress depends also on the bar diameter, the bar spacing and the bar cover.) Clearly, crack widths need checking only at the surface of a structure for stress states due to load combinations related to the serviceability limit state.

See also
Reinforced concrete
Solid mechanics
Structural engineering

References

Composite materials
Plasticity (physics)
Reinforced concrete
Structural analysis